Jane Kean (April 10, 1923 – November 26, 2013) was an American actress and singer whose career in show business spanned seven decades and included appearing in nightclubs, on recordings, and in radio, television, Broadway and films. Among her most famous roles were as Trixie Norton on The Jackie Gleason Show, and as the voice of Belle in the perennial favorite Mister Magoo's Christmas Carol.

Career
Kean and her older sister Betty Kean, formed a comedy duo that worked the nightclub circuit throughout the 1940s/50s, and the two appeared on Broadway as sisters in the short-lived 1955 musical, Ankles Aweigh. Jane Kean was the sister-in-law of actor Lew Parker, best known as Lou Marie, the father of Marlo Thomas's character, Ann Marie, on That Girl. She was also the sister-in-law of Jim Backus, with whom she co-starred in Mister Magoo's Christmas Carol. Parker and Backus were two of Betty Kean's husbands.

She studied acting with Sanford Meisner at the Neighborhood Playhouse. She appeared in starring roles on Broadway in the 1950s in Will Success Spoil Rock Hunter?, in which she succeeded Jayne Mansfield. Other credits include Fats Waller's 1943 Broadway musical Early to Bed, Call Me Mister (in which she succeeded Betty Garrett), The Pajama Game, and Carnival! (succeeding Kaye Ballard). She had a featured role in Take Me Along which starred Jackie Gleason, who would remember her a few years later when casting his weekly hour television program. She co-starred with Charlotte Rae in the 2002 Los Angeles production of the Kander and Ebb musical 70, Girls, 70 at the El Portal Theatre.

Television audiences remember Kean for her role of Trixie Norton in a series of hour-long Honeymooners episodes—in color and with music—on The Jackie Gleason Show from 1966 to 1970. She succeeded Joyce Randolph, who had played the role in earlier sketches and on the 1955–56 sitcom The Honeymooners, but Kean went on to play the role for many more years than her predecessor. Other credits included appearances on The Phil Silvers Show, Make Room for Daddy, The Lucy Show, Love, American Style, The Love Boat, The Facts of Life and Dallas. Her feature films include the character of Miss Taylor in Walt Disney's live-action musical with animation Pete's Dragon and voiced the character Belle in the 1962 television special Mister Magoo's Christmas Carol, which continues to be shown every year. She was profiled in the 2011 documentary Troupers, which aired on PBS. Her last film, Abner, The Invisible Dog, in which she played "Aunt Ida", was completed in 2013.

In 2003, she wrote a memoir, A Funny Thing Happened on the Way to The Honeymooners ... I Had a Life.

She appeared in The Phil Silvers Show (Sergeant Bilko) episode Doberman, Missing Heir.

Personal life
Kean was married to director and producer Dick Linkroum from 1962 to 1969 and to actor/producer Joe Hecht from 1970 until his death in 2005. Kean had no children.

Death
Kean died on November 26, 2013, at age 90, at Providence St. Joseph Medical Center in Burbank, California of complications from a fall.

Filmography

References

External links
 
 

1923 births
2013 deaths
American film actresses
American stage actresses
American television actresses
American voice actresses
American musical theatre actresses
Actresses from Hartford, Connecticut
Accidental deaths from falls
21st-century American women